Pape Ciré Dia (born August 19, 1980) is a Senegalese footballer.

Club career
Dia debuted with ASC Diaraf, a club that played in the first division. In 2000, he left his country for Kuwait and signed for Al Salmiya Club with which he spent three years. After that, he played two years with Al Kuwait Kaifan.

Dia returned to his first club ASC Diaraf after his adventure abroad, but after a little while he signed for Turkish team Çaykur Rizespor and from there he moved to Raja Casablanca.

In February 2012, Dia joined the Malaysian club Felda United FC. After two months with Felda United FC he was released.

External links
 
 

1980 births
Living people
Senegalese footballers
Çaykur Rizespor footballers
Raja CA players
Süper Lig players
ASC Jaraaf players
Senegalese expatriate sportspeople in Kuwait
Expatriate footballers in Kuwait
Senegalese expatriate sportspeople in Turkey
Expatriate footballers in Turkey
Senegalese expatriate sportspeople in Morocco
Expatriate footballers in Morocco
Senegalese expatriate sportspeople in Malaysia
Expatriate footballers in Malaysia
Association football forwards
Senegal international footballers
Kuwait SC players
Kuwait Premier League players